The 2008–09 American Eagles men's basketball team represented American University during the 2008–09 NCAA Division I men's basketball season. The Eagles, led by head coach Jeff Jones, played their home games at Bender Arena and were members of the Patriot League. They finished the season 24–8, 13–1 in Patriot League play to finish first in the conference regular season standings. They were champions of the Patriot League tournament to earn an automatic bid to the NCAA tournament – the school's second straight appearance – where they lost in the first round to Villanova.

Roster

Schedule and results

|-
!colspan=9 style=| Non-Conference Regular season

|-
!colspan=9 style=| Patriot League Regular season

|-
!colspan=9 style=| Patriot League tournament

|-
!colspan=9 style=| NCAA tournament

References

American Eagles men's basketball seasons
American
American Eagles men's basketball
American Eagles men's basketball
American